Frédéric Kyburz (10 August 1943 – 1 August 2018) was a Swiss judoka. He competed in the men's half-heavyweight event at the 1972 Summer Olympics.

References

1943 births
2018 deaths
Swiss male judoka
Olympic judoka of Switzerland
Judoka at the 1972 Summer Olympics
Place of birth missing
20th-century Swiss people